Janet Taylor (13 May 1804 – 25 January 1870) born Jane Ann Ionn, was an English astronomer, navigation expert, mathematician, and meteorologist. She published various works on astronomy and navigation, founded an academy for the teaching of these subjects, and ran a warehouse focused on the distribution, production and repair of navigational instruments. Her Academy was highly regarded and recommended by the East India Company, Trinity House, and the Admiralty. In recognition of her work, she was awarded medals by the Kings of Prussia and the Kings of the Netherlands, and her rule for calculating latitude from altitudes was described as "ingenious". Taylor was one of the very few women working as a scientific instrument maker in London in the 19th century. Her "Mariner's Calculator", patented in 1834, was dismissed by the Admiralty.

Early life 
Taylor was born in Wolsingham, England to Reverend Peter Ionn and Jane Deighton, being the sixth born of the family of eight. Her father was master of the Free Grammar School, which was one of the few north county schools that included navigation in its curriculum, and he allowed Jane Ann to attend both the basic grammar school and theoretical navigation tuition. At the age of nine, she gained a scholarship to attend Queen Charlotte’s school, Royal School for Embroidering Females, in Ampthill, Bedfordshire, where all the students started at the age of fourteen. After her father's death, Jane Ann continued her education with theoretical navigation studies. Her father's passing left her with a good fortune, which she invested wholeheartedly into a career in nautical education, a male dominated field at the time. In 1821, she worked for her older brother's business, managing all his finances with ease due to her amazing math skills. In 1831, she became a stepmother to George Taylor's three children.

Achievements 
Janet Taylor opened her first academy, the George Taylor Nautical Academy,  in 1833 with her husband's support. This academy was strictly made for merchant service officers. During this time period she published "Luni-Solar and Horary Tables: with their application in nautical astronomy; containing an easy and correct method of finding the longitude, by lunar observations and chronometers; the latitude, by double altitudes and elapsed time, the azimuth, amplitude, and true time," which discussed calculations that were able to "reduce the lunar distance" that used a formula she derived herself.

She continued her path in navigation and in 1834 received a patent for her invention of the Mariner's Calculator. The invention did not get approved by Admiralty, deeming it unworthy for the Lordships Patronage. Later on, she published a second edition of the book, "Principles of Navigation Simplified." Though, the cost of creating the second edition of this book and the Mariner's Calculator put her in a place where she was slowly draining her capital.

Afterwards, she spent some time working on the formula she derived for her first published book to further improve it. Around the mid-1835, she had a child. After the improvement on the formula she derived for some time she was able to publish the second edition of the "Luni-Solar and Horary Tables," She owed much of this success to the hydrographer Francis Beaufort, who helped push for the acceptance of her work by the Naval establishment.

Luni-Solar and Horary Tables 
This was Janet Taylor's first published book, done in 1833. This book was specifically meant to simplify the calculations of astronomical navigation by using the moon instead of the sun as one's point of reference. During the time surrounding this publication, there would be a lot of criticism around finding the best way to calculate longitude while at sea.

Luni-Solar and Horary Tables  would become a great success, due to Taylor's discovery proving that the earth is spheroidal rather than spherical. Knowing how big of a contribution this discovery would make to in her field, she proceeds to use  "he" instead of "her" to refer to herself throughout the book, because of how male-dominated her field was.

To pay respects to Queen Charlotte, who gave her a scholarship to her school regardless of her age, Taylor dedicated this book to King William IV, her son. King William IV was incredibly impressed by Taylor's mathematical principles and her writing in layman's terms for young mariner's to learn, that he offered her a job as an educator for nobility. Though she declined, Taylor knew having a King impressed with her writing, would help her a lot on the road to being a respected author and educator.

By the end of 1833, the first edition of Luni-Solar and Horary Tables would be reviewed in The United Service Journal, The Atlas, and The Morning Advertiser. All of which would be positive reviews, urging young mariners to use this as their basis of studying.  In 1834, Taylor would publish a shorter version of Luni-Solar and Horary Tables called: The Principles of Navigation Simplified: with Luni-Solar and horary tables, and their application in Nautical Astronomy, where she would continue getting amazing reviews in famous magazines.

In 1835, after getting support and a grant from the Admiralty, Trinity House, and East India Company, Taylor was able to publish the second edition of Luni-solar and Horary Tables, and soon after in 1836, she would go on to publish the third edition. By 1854, she published her seventh and last edition to this book.  Being a promoted author, Taylor published a second book, An Epitome of Navigation, and Nautical Astronomy, with the Improved Lunar Tables, in 1842. This book however, she did not refer to her readers as males, using "the student" or "Practical Navigator" instead" compared to her first book. Since she has already proved herself as a woman in this extremely male-dominate field, she was no longer concerned by these simple details. She would go on to publish twelve editions of "Epitome of Navigation," by 1859.

Mrs. Janet Taylor's Nautical Academy and Navigation Warehouse. 
After Taylor's book, Luni-Solar and Horary Tables, second edition came out in 1835, and was selling good, along with the steady income from her first nautical academy, she was able to open her second academy named after her this time during late 1835. This success meant Taylor was increasingly recognized as a credible mathematician and entrepreneur. Mrs. Janet Taylor's Nautical Academy and Navigation Warehouse offered training in all subjects a mariner would need: "a complete course on Navigation, including Trigonometry, and its application to Navigation. Another course was Algebra, Geometry, Physical Geography in relation to the velocity of tides, waves, etc. Mechanics including the Composition of Forces, Mechanical

powers, the Laws of Motion, the strength of strain, of materials; wind, rain, steam powers, Atmospheric and Oceanic Phenomena... and so it continued....".

During the late 1830's and 40's, her academies would be advertised by The Shipping and Mercantile Gazette and the London Shipping Gazette.

Janet Taylor's second academy had a very large and positive impact on the young English mariners. So much so that the expansion of her second nautical academy was endorsed by organizations like: the Admiralty, the Trinity House, and the East India Company. This expansion allowed her to house pupils who would not have been able to attend otherwise.

Inventions 
Janet Taylor, before anything was an instrument maker, and established herself as such. 1838 was when her first advertisements for her very own chronometers were appearing. After her discovery that the Earth was spheroidal, Taylor would create and adjust compasses, sextants, binnacles, and other nautical tools to keep up with this new discovery and the principles that came with it.

The Mariner's compass, while not endorsed by the Admiralty, could be considered Taylor's "most notable" invention.

In 1850, Taylor developed and designed a quintant for the Prince of Wales, who would later become King Edward VII, specifically made for royalty with space at the bottom for Prince Edward's three-feathered family crest. A year. later, Prince Albert decided to host the Great Exhibition of 1851, which would really boost Taylor among 15,000 male inventors. There she presented her "bronze binnacle, with compass, designed from the water lily."

For three years following the Great Exhibition of 1851, Taylor would continue to develop many binnacles, by performing experiments consisting of swinging ships back and forth across the Thames and recording the compass actions. She would then explain these results in a letter to astronomer George Biddell Airy in 1854. This letter would lead to a great professional relationship between Airy and Taylor for a while to come.

In 1856, Taylor invented another nautical instrument consisting of an attachment for sextants and quadrants, called sea artificial horizon.

In 1862, Janet Taylor presented a newly innovated sextant and her mariner's compass at the 1862 London International Exhibition of Industry and Art. Her developed sextant was incredibly popular with the public.

Later life 
1853 was the start of hapless events for Mrs. Taylor, starting with her husband, George Taylor's, death. and then both of her senior employees leaving her to start their businesses. From 1860, Taylor began to receive a Civil List Pension of £50 per year, and around this year her nautical academy changed its name to Mrs Janet Taylor and Co, turning her academy into a company. In 1863, she published the sixth edition of Directions To The Planisphere Of The Stars, but unfortunately that was still not enough to help with her financial troubles. In 1864, Taylor declared bankruptcy and left London as a whole, in 1866. By 1870 she became ill. During this time she was with her sister Joyce and her husband the Rev. Matthew Chester. On the 26th of January in 1870, Mrs. Janet Taylor died of bronchitis. On her death certificate, her occupation is stated as "Teacher of Navigation."

Works
Lunar Tables for Calculating Distances
Luni-Solar and Horary Tables
Principles of Navigation Simplified
Epitome of Navigation
Directions To The Planisphere Of The Stars, With Introductory Remarks on The Stellar and Planetary Systems

References

Further reading
 
 
 
Rose, Laura (2014). Poppy's with Honour. AuthorHouse. p. 87.
Croucher, John S. & Rosalind F. Mistress of Science. p. 60.
Great Exhibition London, England. 1851. Official catalogue of the Great exhibition of the works of industry of all nations, 1851. 2nd ed. London: Spicer Brothers. 320 pp. 49.

External links
 

1804 births
1870 deaths
19th-century British astronomers
Women astronomers
19th-century British women scientists